Zajedničar (Fraternalist) is a newspaper of the Croatian Fraternal Union of America (CFU), a fraternal benefit society of the Croatian diaspora.

The magazine was started in 1904, during the CFU's presidency of Josip Marohnić, its founder and the first president.

Zajedničar is headquartered and printed in Pittsburgh, Pennsylvania. It is published in dual-language format with the first section in English and the second section being a full Croatian translation. Since 2009, the newspaper is also distributed in PDF format.  The paper is the only ongoing Croatian-language newspaper in the United States.

References

External links
 

Croatian-American history
Newspapers published in Pittsburgh
Publications established in 1904
Croatian-American culture in Pennsylvania
Croatian-language newspapers
Bilingual newspapers
Non-English-language newspapers published in Pennsylvania